Overweight Pooch (born Tonya Davis) is a female rapper. Her name comes from her childhood nickname.

Career
In 1991, she released her only album to date Female Preacher on A&M Records, and scored a moderate commercial success with the single "I Like It", which charted at number #16 on the U.S. Billboard Hot Dance Music/Club Play chart, and at #58 in the UK Singles Chart. The composition featured vocals by CeCe Peniston, who contributed on another two songs on Davis' album ("Kickin' Da Blues" and "Female Preacher"). She has 3 children, her oldest son Nathaniel, daughter Nate'Sha and youngest Nasante' Taylor.

Discography

Albums

Singles

Promotional releases
"Hip House Party" (1991)

References

External links

 Overweight Pooch on Discogs
 [ Overweight Pooch] at Billboard.com

Living people
Rappers from New York City
American women rappers
African-American women rappers
A&M Records artists
21st-century American rappers
21st-century American women musicians
Year of birth missing (living people)
21st-century African-American women
21st-century African-American musicians
21st-century women rappers